Arlette Wilmes (born 20 May 1950) is a Luxembourgian former swimmer. She competed in two events at the 1968 Summer Olympics.

References

1950 births
Living people
Luxembourgian female swimmers
Olympic swimmers of Luxembourg
Swimmers at the 1968 Summer Olympics
Sportspeople from Luxembourg City